Bert-Jan Ruissen  (born 22 March 1972) is a Dutch politician and Member of the European Parliament (MEP) from the Netherlands. He is a member of the Reformed Political Party (SGP), part of the European Conservatives and Reformists (ECR).

Ruissen studied plant science at Wageningen University and Research in The Netherlands. In 1995 he became assistant to MEP Leen van der Waal in the European Parliament. Later he worked as advisor for EU Agriculture Policy at the Ministry of Agriculture, Nature and Food Quality.

Political career
Ruissen was elected to the local council of Krimpen aan den IJssel from 2006 until 2019. In the 2019 European Parliament election he was elected from the second place of a common list of Christian Union – Reformed Political Party.
He became full Member of the European Parliament Committee on Agriculture and Rural Development, as well substitute Member of the European Parliament Committee on Fisheries and European Parliament Committee on Foreign Affairs. He also serves as first vice chair of the European Parliament delegation for the relations with Israel.

In his maiden speech in the European Parliament, in September 2019, he spoke out against patents on plant characteristics.

As a member of the European Parliament, he voted against the new European Commission of president Ursula von der Leyen, because he considered her programme to be too federalist. Later he also voted against the resolution to denounce the LGBT-free zones in Poland, because the resolution called on EU Member States to recognise same-sex marriage. Ruissen in 2019 was one of the Members of the European Parliament visiting Taiwan, expressing support. In January 2020 he voted against the European Green Deal, proposed by EU commissioner Frans Timmermans, saying in his view the proposal is unrealistic.

Personal life
Bert-Jan Ruissen is married and has four children.

References

Living people
1972 births
Reformed Political Party politicians
Reformed Political Party MEPs
20th-century Dutch journalists
Dutch commentators
20th-century Dutch historians
People from Reimerswaal
Wageningen University and Research alumni
MEPs for the Netherlands 2019–2024